Amy Elizabeth Macdonald (born 25 August 1987) is a Scottish singer-songwriter. In 2007, she released her debut studio album, This Is the Life, which respectively produced the singles "Mr. Rock & Roll" and "This Is the Life"; the latter charting at number one in six countries, while reaching the top 10 in another 11 countries. The album reached number one in four European countries  the United Kingdom, Denmark, the Netherlands and Switzerland  and sold three million copies worldwide. Moderate success in the American music market followed in 2008. Macdonald has sold over 12 million records worldwide.

Macdonald's second studio album, A Curious Thing, was released in 2010. Its lead single "Don't Tell Me That It's Over" peaked at number 45 on the UK Singles Chart, and reached the Top 10 in several mainland European countries. In 2010, she collaborated with Ray Davies on his album, See My Friends; she sang with him on a cover of The Kinks' 60s hit "Dead End Street". Her third studio album, Life in a Beautiful Light, was released in 2012 and supplied three singles: "Slow It Down", "Pride" and "4th of July".

In 2017, Macdonald released her fourth studio album, Under Stars, which entered at number two on the Scottish and UK Album Charts. It also peaked within the top 10 of the album charts in Germany and New Zealand. In 2020, she released her fifth studio album, The Human Demands.

Early life
Amy Elizabeth Macdonald was born on 25th August 1987. She attended Bishopbriggs High School in East Dunbartonshire, Scotland. After being inspired by Travis at the T in the Park festival in 2000, she heard Travis' song "Turn" and wanted to play it herself.
She bought a Travis chord book, and started playing on her father's guitar, teaching herself how to play at only 12 years old. Soon afterward she began composing her own songs, the first being called "The Wall". She started playing in pubs and coffee houses around Glasgow at the age of 15, including the Brunswick Cellars on Sauchiehall Street.

Career

Breakthrough

Macdonald sent a demo CD in response to an advertisement placed in the NME by a new production company set up by songwriters Pete Wilkinson and Sarah Erasmus. Wilkinson said he was "literally aghast" at her songwriting abilities when first he heard Macdonald play the songs "This Is the Life" and "Mr Rock n Roll". He then spent around eight or nine months recording demos with Macdonald at his home studio with a view to securing a record deal for his new client. In 2007 she signed a contract with Vertigo.

2007–2009: This Is the Life

In 2007 Macdonald released her debut album, titled This Is the Life. The album sold three million copies, and reached No. 1 in the UK, the Netherlands, Switzerland and Denmark. This Is the Life reached No. 92 on the US Billboard 200. The single, "This Is the Life" reached No. 25 on the US Billboard Triple-A radio airplay charts.

The first single from the album, "Poison Prince", was only a limited release. The second single, "Mr. Rock and Roll", became Macdonald's first top 40 song, charting at No. 12 in the United Kingdom. However the third single, "LA", missed the top 40 at No. 48.

The fourth and most successful single, "This Is the Life", charted at No. 28 in the UK, and was No. 1 in five other European countries. The single was awarded Platinum in Germany and Belgium and Gold in Spain and Switzerland. It was also the theme song of True Law (Prawo Agaty), a Polish legal drama TV series. The fifth single, "Run", gave Macdonald her second lowest chart position in the UK at No. 75. However, "Run" charted at No. 36 in Germany. The sixth and final single was the re-release of "Poison Prince"; it charted at No. 148 in the UK, Macdonald's lowest chart position.

The album's track "Youth of Today" was chosen as the first single featured on Bebo/iTunes' "Free Single of the Week" program.

She appeared as a musical performing guest on British and foreign shows including The Album Chart Show, Loose Women, Friday Night Project, Taratata (France), and This Morning. She won the best newcomer award at the Silver Clef Awards. She has appeared on several US talk shows such as The Late Late Show with Craig Ferguson (2008), where she performed "Mr. Rock and Roll" and also The Ellen DeGeneres Show (2008) where she performed her hit single, "This Is the Life".

2010–2011: A Curious Thing

Macdonald began working on her second album in 2009. She said "Some of the sounds are just amazing and we've managed to persuade one of my favourite artists to whack some stuff down on them, but you'll have to wait and see." The artist in question was Paul Weller, who contributed electric guitar on the track "Love Love" and piano and bass guitar on the track "This Pretty Face". Titled A Curious Thing, it was released on 8 March 2010.

The album was preceded by the release of the first single from it, "Don't Tell Me That It's Over", a week earlier on 1 March 2010. The single was released to UK radio on 11 January, and Amy performed it that same day on the Simon Mayo Show on BBC Radio 2. "Don't Tell Me That It's Over" was also released to radio in countries like UK, Switzerland, Germany and France. The album's second single "Spark" was released on 10 May 2010 on digital download format. Macdonald also confirmed that she would tour the United Kingdom and other parts of Europe in 2010.

The album's third single "This Pretty Face" was released on 19 July 2010 after Macdonald confirmed she would embark on a tour entitled The Love Love Tour. Also that year, she was one of a number of artists who recorded with Ray Davies on his 2010 album See My Friends, in which she sang with him on "Dead End Street".

2011–2015: Life in a Beautiful Light

Macdonald's third album, Life in a Beautiful Light, was released on 11 June 2012. Macdonald began to write Life in a Beautiful Light after having a "lovely year off" following touring in support of A Curious Thing. Macdonald had no time to write songs on her second album as she was touring with This Is the Life. However, Macdonald said she felt that the creation of Life in a Beautiful Light was a more natural process. Two songs from Life in a Beautiful Light were begun before Macdonald's break. "In the End" was written with Macdonald questioning herself whether being a musician was a worthwhile occupation.

Macdonald wrote "Human Spirit" inspired by the Chilean miners' rescue. The song "Left That Body Long Ago" described her grandmother's decline into Alzheimer's disease whilst "Across the Nile" is a response to the conflict of the Arab Spring.

Three songs from the album were released as singles: "Slow It Down", "Pride" and "4th of July". She told BBC News that Pride was written to describe her feelings about performing Flower of Scotland at Hampden Park prior to Scotland international football matches.

Macdonald wrote the last track on the album, In the End, at the end of her previous tour and Life in a Beautiful Light was then recorded in Surrey. It was produced by Pete Wilkinson and mixed by Bob Clearmountain, who previously worked on her debut album. On 2 June 2012 she sang her song "Slow It Down" with the finalist of the second season of the Polish version of The X Factor, a girl group the Chance.

2016–2018: Under Stars

Macdonald began writing songs for a new album in early 2014, 2 years following the release of her previous album, Life in a Beautiful Light. In May 2014, she performed 4 new songs live. She also sang "Leap of Faith" during the Scottish independence referendum in September 2014. In March 2015, Macdonald announced via Twitter she was finishing the songwriting of the album, but had not yet started recording. On 28 October 2015, she announced via Twitter she started the recording sessions for the album. Later, she stated on 9 December 2015 via her Instagram account that she had finished the songwriting for the album and that she hoped the album would be finished sometime in 2016. On 9 August 2016, Macdonald announced via Instagram her fourth album was finished and would be released early 2017.

Macdonald said although it was two and a half years in the making, which is the longest she has ever taken with an album, she was glad to have taken the time and she feels the album has "the TLC that it deserves".

Macdonald released the new album entitled Under Stars on 17 February 2017. A video of an acoustic version of new album track "Down by the Water" was also released. She performed live on BBC Scotland's Hogmanay 2017 show where she debuted her upcoming single "Dream On".

2018–2019: Woman of the World (The Best of 2007–2018)
In September 2018, Macdonald announced her first greatest hits album, Woman of the World (The Best of 2007–2018), which includes all of her successful songs, plus a previously unreleased song, "Woman of the World". The album was released on 23 November 2018. Macdonald also announced a European tour, which she embarked on during March and April 2019.

2020–present: The Human Demands
Macdonald started writing songs between 2018 and 2019 and she started the recording of her fifth studio album in February 2020. After an interruption caused by the COVID-19 pandemic in March, she resumed recording in June 2020.

On 27 August 2020, she released the album's lead single "The Hudson" and said the release of album The Human Demands would be on 30 October 2020. Macdonald also announced a European tour, which she will embark on between April and July 2021. Macdonald discussed the album, and performed an acoustic version of the track "We Could Be So Much More", on BBC Radio 4's Front Row in November 2020.

On 15 May 2021, she represented Scotland at the Free European Song Contest 2021, hosted in Cologne, Germany. Her song "Statues" ultimately finished in fourth place with 77 points.

Musical style
Reviewers have described Amy as softly spoken but with a booming singing voice. Her vocal range is contralto.

Macdonald cites Travis as her biggest influence. Other influences include the Killers and Rammstein.

Personal life
Macdonald is a fan of cars, and has owned a Range Rover Vogue, an Audi R8, a Nissan GT-R and a Ferrari 458 Italia amongst others.  

She was engaged to footballer Steve Lovell in 2008, but did not marry. She announced in January 2016 that she was engaged to footballer Richard Foster. They married in 2018 in Las Vegas. Macdonald is a supporter of Rangers

Politics
Macdonald expressed concerns and scepticism about Brexit at numerous times. In 2017, she stated that she might have to leave the United Kingdom and relocate to Germany if Brexit went ahead.

Discography

 This Is the Life (2007)
 A Curious Thing (2010)
 Life in a Beautiful Light (2012)
 Under Stars (2017)
 The Human Demands (2020)

Accolades

Awards overview
Macdonald won Best Newcomer at the 2008 Tartan Clef Awards and Best Newcomer at the 2008 Silver Clef Awards. In December 2008 she was voted "Scottish person of the year" by The Daily Record.

Macdonald performed, along with U2, at the German 2009 Echo Awards, where she won an award in the category "Best International Newcomer". She also won Best International Album and Best International Song at the 2009 Swiss Music Awards.

In 2010, Macdonald won "Best Album" for A Curious Thing, at the annual Tartan Clef awards on 20 November in Glasgow. Also, Macdonald won "Best International Album Rock/Pop" with A Curious Thing at the Swiss Music Awards in March 2011. Furthermore, Macdonald won "Best International Rock/Pop Female" at the Echo Awards.

On 23 August 2013, Macdonald performed at the 46th Sopot International Song Festival in Poland with her songs "This Is the Life" and "Slow It Down". She was awarded there a special prize by the Radio RMF FM.

In 2013, Macdonald was shortlisted for the Scottish Fashion Awards "Scottish Fashion Icon 2013". She was shortlisted again in 2014 and won the award.

Awards and nominations

References

External links 

 Amy Macdonald Official site

1987 births
Living people
Musicians from Glasgow
Scottish contraltos
21st-century Scottish women singers
Scottish women guitarists
Scottish women singer-songwriters
People from Bishopbriggs
People educated at Bishopbriggs High School
Vertigo Records artists
21st-century British guitarists
Association footballers' wives and girlfriends
Musicians from East Dunbartonshire
21st-century women guitarists